Jonathan Kemp (born 1967) is an English writer. He has published two novels, London Triptych and Ghosting, as well as one short-story collection, Twentysix, to date.

He won the Authors' Club First Novel Award in 2011 for London Triptych. The book was republished in North America by Arsenal Pulp Press in 2013.

Originally from Manchester, Kemp teaches creative writing, literature and queer theory at Birkbeck, University of London. He is gay.

Works
London Triptych (Myriad Editions, 2010)
Twentysix (Myriad, 2011)
Ghosting (Myriad, 2015)
The Penetrated Male (Punctum Books, 2013)

References

1967 births
21st-century English novelists
English short story writers
English gay writers
Living people
Writers from Manchester
English LGBT novelists
English male short story writers
English male novelists
21st-century British short story writers
21st-century English male writers